Life Science Alliance is a peer-reviewed, open access and not-for-profit journal for the biomedical and life sciences. EMBO Press, Rockefeller University Press and Cold Spring Harbor Laboratory Press jointly established the journal in 2018. It is a signatory of the San Francisco Declaration on Research Assessment. The journal is currently edited by the Executive Editor Eric Sawey.

Abstracting, indexing and memberships 

The journal is abstracted and indexed in Scopus, Web of Science, PubMed Central, and Medline. It is member of OASPA, DOAJ, CLOCKSS, COPE, CHORUS, ORCID, Crossref.

External links

References 

Biology journals
Publications established in 2018
Open access journals
Continuous journals